Schönsee is a town in the Schwandorf district of Bavaria, Germany, near the border with the Czech Republic, 38 km northeast of Schwandorf, and 34 km southeast of Weiden in der Oberpfalz.

References

Schwandorf (district)